Proni may refer to:
Proni (Greece), a town of ancient Cephallenia, Greece
Alessandro Proni (born 1982), Italian bicycle racer
Tullio Proni (born 1948), American psychologist and artist
Public Record Office of Northern Ireland (PRONI)